Gay-Lussac is a lunar impact crater located to the north of the prominent crater Copernicus, in the southern foothills of the Montes Carpatus range. The rim of the crater is slightly distorted, although generally circular. The inner floor is flat but rough, with no central peak. There are a pair of small craterlet depressions in the middle instead of a central peak. The associated crater Gay-Lussac A is nearly joined to the southeast rim.

The crater is named after French physicist Joseph Louis Gay-Lussac.

To the southwest is a wide rille named Rima Gay-Lussac. This is a nearly linear formation with curves at the end. It follows a 40-km-long line from the southwest to the northeast.

Satellite craters

By convention these features are identified on lunar maps by placing the letter on the side of the crater midpoint that is closest to Gay-Lussac.

References

External links

Gay-Lussac at The Moon Wiki

Impact craters on the Moon